Flocking is a 2015 Swedish drama film directed by Beata Gårdeler. It won three awards at the 51st Guldbagge Awards and the main award at the 33rd Ale Kino! Festival.

Cast
 Fatime Azemi as Jennifer
 John Risto as Alexander
 Eva Melander as Susanne
 Malin Levanon as Mia
 Henrik Dorsin as Tony
 Jakob Öhrman as David
 Mattias Kågström as Peo
 Pasi Haapala as Fredrik

References

External links
 

2015 films
2015 drama films
Swedish drama films
2010s Swedish-language films
2010s Swedish films